Kendal Castle is a medieval fortification to the east of the town of Kendal, Cumbria, in northern England. The castle, which is atop a glacial drumlin, was built in the 13th century as the  Caput baroniae for the Barony of Kendal. By the 15th century, the Parr family owned the castle.

History 
The castle was built in the late 12th century as the home of the Lancaster family who were Barons of Kendal. The best-known family associated with the castle was the Parr family; including Queen Catherine Parr, the sixth wife of King Henry VIII of England. Her family had lived at Kendal since her ancestor Sir William Parr married the heiress of Kendal, Elizabeth Ros, during the reign of Edward III of England. By the time Catherine Parr was born, the family had long deserted the castle which was already falling into disrepair. Catherine's father preferred to live in the centre of court in London. Sir Thomas's father seems to be the last of the Parrs to have lived at Kendal Castle. Queen Catherine Parr  was once thought to have been born at the castle; however, modern research has shown that it was in great disrepair by the 16th century and she was most likely born in Blackfriars, London.

Today 
The site, which has been a ruin since Tudor times, is accessible to the public and managed by the South Lakeland District Council.

Gallery

References

Further reading

External links 

BBC Cumbria: Oil painting of Kendal Castle in 1650; fantasy picture 2007.
Kendal Castle 2
The Cumbria Directory - Kendal Castle

Castles in Cumbria
Ruins in Cumbria
Archaeology of the United Kingdom
Kendal